Kyaliwajjala is a neighborhood in Kira Municipality, Kyaddondo County, Wakiso District, in Central Uganda.

Location
Kyaliwajja is bordered by Namugongo to the northeast, Bweyogerere to the southeast, Naalya to the south, Najjera to the west and Downtown Kira to the northwest. The coordinates of Kyaliwajjala are:0°22'48.0"N 32°38'47.0"E (Latitude:0.380000; Longitude:32.646389).

Overview
In the 1960s and 1980s, Kyaliwajjala was a trading center at a road intersection. During the 21st Century it has developed into a bustling urban center with banks, retail shops, gasoline stations, pharmacies and hardware stores. The Kampala Northern Bypass Highway passes through Naalya, to the south of the neighborhood.

Population
During the 2002 national population census, the population of Kyaliwajjala was estimated at about 16,200 or 11.5% of the total population of Kira. In 2011, the population of Kira Municipality was estimated at 179,800, by the Uganda Bureau of Statistics (UBOS). Using those data, the population of Kyaliwajjala was estimated at about 21,000 inhabitants, in 2011. During 2012, the Kira Municipality authorities estimated Kyaliwajjala's population at about 50,000.

Points of interest
These are some of the points of interest in or near Kyaliwajjala:
 The Namugongo Road - Leads to the Uganda Martyr's Basilica at Namugongo
 Naalya Housing Estate - A high-rise condominium and apartment complex constructed by National Housing and Construction Company 
 Vienna College - A private, mixed, residential high school (S1 - S4)
 Quality Shopping Mall - A shopping complex anchored by Quality Supermarket
 A branch of DFCU Bank, located at Quality Shopping Mall
 A branch of Guaranty Trust Bank Uganda - Located on Namugongo Road

Photos and diagrams
 Photograph of Kyaliwajjala In 2013, at Monitor.co.ug

See also

References

External links
Iryn Namubiru Entertains Her Kyaliwajjala Fans Through The Night (Luganda)

Kira Town
Populated places in Central Region, Uganda
Cities in the Great Rift Valley